Rajesh Raghunath Patil is an Indian politician in the Bahujan Vikas Aaghadi party. He was elected as a member of the Maharashtra Legislative Assembly from Boisar on 24 October 2019.

Early life and education
Patil was born in 1975 in Vasai Taluka of Palghar district of Maharashtra to his father Raghunath Hiraji Patil. He married  Rajshree Patil, they had two sons named Shivam and Shaurya Patil. In 1994, he got degree of SY B.comm. from Vartak College, Vasai (Mumbai University).

Political career
Patil has been a member of the 14th Legislative Assembly of Maharashtra. Since 2019, he has represented the Boisar constituency and is a member of the Bahujan Vikas Aghadi.

In 2019 elections, he defeated his nearest rival Shiv Sena candidate or current MLA Vilas Tare by a margin of 2,752 votes.

Posts held

References

Maharashtra MLAs 2019–2024
Living people
Bahujan Vikas Aghadi politicians
1975 births
People from Palghar district